The Wildwood Sessions is the sixth live album by the country rock band Poco. The album was recorded live at The Wildwood Lodge in Steelville, MO.

Track listing
"Grand Junction" (Rusty Young) – 2:11
"Cajun Moon" (J.J. Cale) – 5:54
"Save A Corner Of Your Heart For Me" (Rusty Young) – 4:15
" If Your Heart Needs A Hand" (Rusty Young) – 4:36
"Cain’s Blood" (Michael Johnson) – 3:52
"Magnolia" (JJ Cale) – 5:21
"Father's Day" (Craig Bickhardt, Helen Darling) – 3:27
"For The Love Of Mary" (Rusty Young) – 3:55
"Do What You Do" (Paul Cotton, Ron Marzilli) – 3:55
"On The Way Home" (Neil Young) – 4:03

Personnel
Paul Cotton - guitar, vocals
Rusty Young - steel guitar, banjo, dobro, guitar, vocals
Jack Sundrud - bass, vocals

References 

Poco live albums
2006 live albums